The 1895 County Championship was the sixth officially organised running of the County Championship, and ran from 6 May to 2 September 1895. Surrey claimed their fifth title, which was decided by the percentage of completed matches by each side.

The competition saw the first participation in the competition by Derbyshire, Essex, Hampshire, Leicestershire and Warwickshire.

Table
 One point was awarded for a win, and one point was taken away for each loss. Final placings were decided by dividing the number of points earned by the number of completed matches (i.e. those that ended in win or loss).

Leading averages

References

External links
1895 County Championship  at CricketArchive

1895 in English cricket
County Championship seasons
County